John Stanhope, 1st Baron Stanhope (1549? – 9 March 1621) was an English courtier, politician and peer.

Life
He was the third son of Sir Michael Stanhope, born in Yorkshire, but brought up in Nottinghamshire after his father's attainder for treason in 1552. His father's end did not apparently hinder his own career, and he is probably the John Stanhope who was Member of Parliament (MP) for Marlborough in the Parliament of 1572–1581, for Truro in 1586 and for Rochester in 1588.

At court, Stanhope was a Gentleman of the Queen's Privy Chamber. On 22 December 1589 he wrote from Richmond Palace to Lord Talbot describing Queen Elizabeth's good health; "the Queen is so well as I assure you 6 or 7 galliards in a morning, besides music & singing, is her ordinary exercise."

At some point during his early career, Stanhope attached himself to the coat-tails of Sir Robert Cecil, and subsequently proved a reliable ally, receiving in return a series of appointments. He was Custos Rotulorum of the North Riding and Vice-Admiral of Yorkshire for many years and a member of the Council of the North. In 1590 was appointed Master of the King's Posts and in 1596 knighted and appointed as Treasurer of the Chamber.

In 1597, Stanhope stood for election to Parliament as Member for Yorkshire, presumably assuming that with his own standing and Cecil's backing he would be certain of success, but they had not reckoned with the independence of the large electorate - Stanhope spent most of his time at court and no longer lived in Yorkshire, and despite his local roots they may have considered him an outsider. According to Stanhope's supporters his principal opponent, Sir John Savile, was backed by only "eight other gentlemen of any reckoning, but with a great number of clothiers and artificers"; but he was local and strongly connected with the clothing industry that provided many of the voters with their livelihood. Stanhope was defeated in a tumultuous election. After the Archbishop of York and other members of the Council of the North reported to the Privy Council that Savile had shown contempt for their authority the council had him arrested, but they could not overturn the election result and were forced to release him in time to take his seat.

Meanwhile, Stanhope was hastily found a seat instead for Preston, a borough Cecil had in his gift as Chancellor of the Duchy of Lancaster. He later sat for Northamptonshire in the Parliament of 1601 and for Newtown from 1604 until, on 2 May 1605, he was raised to the peerage as Baron Stanhope, of Harrington.

As one of Cecil's leading followers, it was rumoured in 1600 that Stanhope would soon become Lord Chancellor. Instead, he was provided for by being appointed Vice-Chamberlain of the Household. In 1603 he was appointed one of the "Commissioners to treat of a Union between England and Scotland", to settle the arrangements for the inheritance of the English throne by the King of Scotland James VI, and in 1609, he became a member of the council of the Virginia Company.

He resigned the Treasurership of the Chamber and retired from his other posts in 1616, and died in 1621. He was succeeded in his peerage (and as Master of the King's Posts) by his son, Charles Stanhope.

Family
Stanhope was twice married: first to Joan, daughter of William Knollys, by whom he had no issue; and secondly, on 6 May 1589, to Margaret, daughter of Henry Macwilliam, one of the queen's gentlemen pensioners. By her he had issue:

Charles, born in 1593, who succeeded as second baron, but died without issue in 1675, when the title became extinct,
Elizabeth, who married Sir Lionel Tollemache, 2nd Baronet; and
Catherine, who married Robert, Viscount Cholmondeley.

Margaret died in 1640 and was buried alongside her husband at St. Martin's-in-the-Fields.

The later peers of the Stanhope family descend from the first baron's brother, Thomas.

References
J. E. Neale, The Elizabethan House of Commons (London: Jonathan Cape, 1949)

Notes

Attribution

|-

|-

1540s births
1621 deaths
Year of birth missing
1
John
Members of the Parliament of England (pre-1707) for Totnes
English MPs 1571
English MPs 1572–1583
English MPs 1584–1585
English MPs 1586–1587
English MPs 1589
English MPs 1597–1598
English MPs 1601
English MPs 1604–1611
Members of the pre-1707 English Parliament for constituencies in Cornwall
United Kingdom Postmasters General